William Paton Ker, FBA (30 August 1855 – 17 July 1923), was a Scottish literary scholar and essayist.

Life
Born in Glasgow in 1855, Ker studied at Glasgow Academy, the University of Glasgow, and Balliol College, Oxford.

He was appointed to a fellowship at All Souls College, Oxford, in 1879. He became Professor of English Literature and History at the University College of South Wales, Cardiff, in 1883, and moved to University College London as Quain Professor in 1889. However he retained his links with Oxford and was there almost every week during the 1910s, and available to keen students there. He was later the Oxford Professor of Poetry from 1920 to his death, at 67, of a heart attack while climbing the Pizzo Bianco (a minor summit in Macugnaga in northern Italy). A plaque commemorates his death in the Old Church cemetery in Macugnaga. A W. P. Ker Memorial Lecture is held at Glasgow University in his honour.

Influence

He is referred to repeatedly in J. R. R. Tolkien's essay Beowulf: The Monsters and the Critics. W. H. Auden's discovery of Ker was a turning point:

"... what good angel lured me into Blackwell's one afternoon and, from such a wilderness of volumes, picked out for me the essays of W. P. Ker? No other critic whom I have subsequently read could have granted me the same vision of a kind of literary All Souls Night in which the dead, the living and the unborn writers of every age and tongue were seen as engaged upon a common, noble and civilizing task. No other could have so instantaneously aroused in me a fascination with prosody, which I have never lost."

Works
Epic and Romance: Essays on Medieval Literature (1897; second edition 1908)
The Dark Ages (Edinburgh: Blackwood, 1904).
   
   
   
English Literature; Medieval (1912) – also known as Medieval English literature
Two Essays (1918)
Sir Walter Scott (1919)
The Art of Poetry (1923)
Collected Essays (1925)
Form And Style In Poetry (1928)
On Modern Literature (1955)
Collected Essays (1968) edited by Charles Whibley

Notes

External links
 
 
 

1855 births
1923 deaths
Academics of Cardiff University
Academics of University College London
Alumni of Balliol College, Oxford
Alumni of the University of Glasgow
Fellows of All Souls College, Oxford
Fellows of the British Academy
Oxford Professors of Poetry
Writers from Glasgow
People educated at the Glasgow Academy
Scottish essayists
Scottish literary critics
Scottish scholars and academics